HMS B1 was the lead boat of the B-class submarines built for the Royal Navy in the first decade of the 20th century. The boat survived the First World War and was sold for scrap in 1921.

Design and description
The B class was an enlarged and improved version of the preceding A class. They displaced  on the surface and  submerged. The B-class submarines had a crew of two officers and thirteen ratings.

For surface running, the boats were powered by a single 16-cylinder  Vickers petrol engine that drove one propeller shaft. When submerged the propeller was driven by a  electric motor. They could reach  on the surface and  underwater.

The boats were armed with two 18-inch (450 mm) torpedo tubes in the bow. They could carry a pair of reload torpedoes, but generally did not as they would have to remove an equal weight of fuel in compensation.

Construction and career
She was originally to have been called A14 but was renamed B1 on completion. The boat was built at the Vickers shipyard in Barrow-in-Furness and launched on 25 October 1904. She was too primitive to be of much use in World War I and was quickly relegated to training duties. B1 was sold for scrap in May 1921.

Notes

References
 
 
 
 
 

 

British B-class submarines
World War I submarines of the United Kingdom
Ships built in Barrow-in-Furness
Royal Navy ship names
1904 ships